Kani Taleh (also Romanized as Kānī Tāleh; also known as Kānī Ţalā and Kānī Tālā) is a village in Sarab Qamish Rural District, in the Central District of Sanandaj County, Kurdistan Province, Iran. At the 2006 census, its population was 16, in 5 families. The village is populated by Kurds.

References 

Towns and villages in Sanandaj County
Kurdish settlements in Kurdistan Province